Hermenegildo González or Mendo I Gonçalves (died between 943 and 950) was a Galician count in the 10th century Kingdom of León, tenente in Deza, and the ancestor of one of the most relevant Galaico-Portuguese lineages of the Early Middle Ages. He appears in medieval charters confirming as Ermegildus Gundisaluis.

Biography
The son of count Gonzalo Betótez and Teresa Eriz, and maternal grandson of count Ero Fernández, Hermenegildo had several brothers and sisters, including Aragonta González, who was the wife of Ordoño II of León before being set aside, and count Pelayo González.

He begins to appear in medieval charters in 926, and apparently died relatively young, as he is no longer seen after 943, and certainly by 950 when his widow and children divide the inheritance, while his widow continues to appear through 981.

Marriage and issue 
He married Mumadona Dias, Countess of Portugal between 915 and 920, daughter of Count Diego Fernández and Countess Onecca (Onega) and founder of the Monastery of Guimarães.  In 926, King Ramiro II of León donated to the couple the village known as Creximir near Guimarães.  Two years later, Mumadona's mother, Onecca, made a donation, confirmed by several magnates, including her son-in-law Hermenegildo, to the Monastery of Lorvão  where she mentions all her children:

 Gonzalo Menéndez, count and dux magnus of Portugal, who first appears in a document of 24 July 950, the same document which confirms Hermenegildo as already dead. 
 Diego Menéndez (died after 964), married to Aldonza and father of a nun at the monastery founded by her grandmother, after whom she was named, Mumadona Dias.
 Ramiro Menéndez (died before 964), married to Adosinda Gutiérrez, daughter of Count Gutierre Menéndez and Ilduara Ériz.  This couple were probably the parents of Queen Velasquita, the first wife of King Bermudo II of León.
 Onecca Menéndez, married to Gutierre Rodríguez
 Nuño Menéndez (died ca. 959);
 Arias Menéndez

Notes

References

Bibliography 
 
 
 

 

10th-century deaths
10th-century people from the Kingdom of León
10th-century counts of Portugal (Asturias-León)

County of Portugal
Year of birth uncertain